Lewis Evan Meredith  (1900 - 1968) was an Anglican bishop, the seventh Suffragan Bishop of Dover in the modern era.

Educated at Lancing College and Trinity College, Cambridge, he was ordained in 1923 and began his career with a curacy at Oswestry. From 1927 to 1931 he was a Minor Canon at Canterbury Cathedral and then held incumbencies at Wath-on-Dearne and Bognor Regis. Following this he was Rural Dean of Eastbourne before ascending to the Episcopate, a post he held for 7 years. In retirement he continued to serve the church as an Assistant Bishop within the Diocese of Gloucester.

Notes

1900 births
People educated at Lancing College
Alumni of Trinity College, Cambridge
Bishops of Dover, Kent
Canons of Canterbury
1968 deaths
20th-century Church of England bishops